Harry Thomas was the  Bishop of Taunton from 1945 until his death a decade later. Born in 1897 and educated at  Oriel College, Oxford he was ordained in  1924. He was a  Lecturer at Ely Theological College and then Archdeacon of Brisbane. An Anglo Catholic he was taken ill in the summer of 1955 and died in hospital on 8 July 1955.

Notes

External links

1897 births
1955 deaths
20th-century Church of England bishops
Alumni of Oriel College, Oxford
Anglican archdeacons in Australia
Anglo-Catholic bishops
Archdeacons of Brisbane
Bishops of Taunton
British Anglo-Catholics
Faculty and staff of Ely Theological College